Alfred III, Prince of Windisch-Grätz (31 October 1851, Prague – 23 November 1927, Tachov) was a Bohemian nobleman and Austro-Hungarian statesman. He served as the 11th Minister-President of Cisleithania and was President of the Herrenhaus from 1895 to 1918. He was married to Princess Marie Gabrielle Eleonore von Auersperg (1855-1933). Through his daughter, Princess Maria Hedwig of Windisch-Grätz, he was a great-grandfather of Princess Michael of Kent (formerly Baroness Marie Christine von Reibnitz). 

He was a son of Alfred II, Prince of Windisch-Grätz and his wife Princess Hedwig of Lobkowicz.

Honours
 Knight of the Order of the Golden Fleece, 1884
 Grand Cross of the Order of St. Stephen, 1895

Ancestry

See also 
Windisch-Graetz
First Grammar School, Celje
 Portrait

References

External links 
 Otto 

1851 births
1927 deaths
19th-century Ministers-President of Austria
Politicians from Prague
Charles University alumni
Windisch-Graetz
Austrian princes
Bohemian nobility
German Bohemian people
Members of the Württembergian Chamber of Lords
Knights of the Golden Fleece of Austria
Grand Crosses of the Order of Saint Stephen of Hungary